Leucosceptrum is a genus of flowering plant in the family Lamiaceae, first described in 1806. It contains only one known species, Leucosceptrum canum, native to south-western China (Sichuan, Tibet, Yunnan),the eastern Himalayas (Nepal, Bhutan, Assam, Nagaland, Bangladesh), and northern Indochina (Myanmar, Thailand, Laos, Vietnam).

References

Lamiaceae
Flora of Asia
Monotypic Lamiaceae genera